Oliver Reynolds (19 June 1921 – 15 February 2014) was a South African cricketer. He played eight first-class matches for Eastern Province between 1945 and 1948.

References

External links
 

1921 births
2014 deaths
South African cricketers
Eastern Province cricketers
Cricketers from Port Elizabeth